Adavi Simhalu ( Forest Lions) is a 1983 Telugu-language action film, produced by C. Ashwini Dutt under the Vyjayanthi Movies banner and directed by K. Raghavendra Rao. The film stars Krishna, Krishnam Raju, Jaya Prada, Sridevi  and music composed by Chakravarthy. The film was simultaneously made in Hindi as Jaani Dost with Dharmendra, Jeetendra, Sridevi and Parveen Babi in pivotal roles. Both movies were made simultaneously by the same banner and director, some of the scenes and artists are replicated in both versions.

Plot
The film begins with Raja Narendra Varma, the owner of the Raj Nagar estate, and his wife, Annapurnamma (Krishna Kumari). The couple have a son and wants a daughter. At that juncture, his brother-in-law, Kondala Rao / Cobra (Rao Gopal Rao), a hoodlum, intrigues to eliminate not just Dharma Raj but his heir Krishna, too, and distorts as an accident. Fortunately, Krishna escapes, acquainted with an orphan Raju and they befriend. At this time, Raju decides to spend time with Krishna, sacrificing his studies in the process. Years roll by, Raju (Krishnam Raju) becomes a truck driver, and Krishna (Krishna) becomes a mobster. Once Raju saves a girl Lalitha (Jayaprada), sister of Krishna, without the knowledge.
Meanwhile, Krishna is associated with Cobra's younger brother Hari (Satyanarayana), who is always disguised. Currently, Raju and Lalitha fall in love, and Veeru falls for the lionhearted Rekha (Sridevi). Meanwhile, Raju learns Krishna's true identity, and discord arises, but this subsides when Krishna is unveiled as an undercover cop. Then, he seizes many gangsters, but Hari escapes. Thereafter, Cobra ploys indict Raju in crime and then seeks to kill Lalitha. Henceforth, Cobra and Hari abscond to a forest where they continue with their misdeeds. Knowing it, Raju breaks the bars. Rekha accompanies him as well because she suspects Hari deceived her mother. Being conscious of it, Cobra attempts to destroy them, but they escape.
Moreover, Krishna unearths his birth secret and realizes Lalitha as his sister. Here Cobra subterfuges to establish Krishna and Raju as rivals. Therein, a battle erupts when they fathom the truth. At last, they destroy Cobra and his gang. Finally, the movie ends happily with the marriages of Krishna and Rekha and Raju and Lalitha.

Cast
Krishna as Krishna
Krishnam Raju as Raju
Jaya Prada as Lalita
Sridevi as Rekha
Rao Gopal Rao as Cobra Kondala Rao
Satyanarayana as Hari
Allu Ramalingaiah
Prasad Babu as Naagu
P. J. Sarma as Dada
Narra Venkateswara Rao
Chalapathi Rao
Malladi as Priest 
Mada
Krishna Kumari as Annapurnamma
Mucherla Aruna
Silk Smitha

Soundtrack

References

External links

1983 films
1980s Telugu-language films
Indian action drama films
1980s action drama films
Films directed by K. Raghavendra Rao
Films scored by K. Chakravarthy
Films set in forests
Telugu films remade in other languages
1983 drama films